Kolesniki is a rural locality (a khutor) in Iskrinskoye Rural Settlement, Uryupinsky District, Volgograd Oblast, Russia. The population was 29 as of 2010.

Geography 
Kolesniki is located in steppe, 63 km southwest of Uryupinsk (the district's administrative centre) by road. Iskra is the nearest rural locality.

References 

Rural localities in Uryupinsky District